HK Prizma Riga/IHS is an ice hockey team in Riga, Latvia, that plays in the Optibet Hockey League, the top tier of the sport in Latvia. The team is based in Riga and play their home games at the Volvo Sports Centre. HK Prizma previously played in both the Eastern European Hockey League and the MHL B.

History
The team was founded in 1997 by logistics company SIA Prizma, originally operating under the name LB/Prizma Riga having partnered up with a team founded by timber company Latvijas Bērzs, and began play in the Latvian Hockey Higher League during the 1998–99 season. They would have an abject debut season losing every one of their games and finishing the season in last place. The following season saw the team continue to struggle, as they lost all but one of their games, and had one tie; they again finished at the foot of the table. In the off-season, they separated from Latvijas Bērzs and rebranded as HK Prizma. Playing under a new name saw the teams fortunes improve; they finished the 2000-01 season in 4th place after winning 8 games. The 2001-02 season saw Prizma field a team in both the Latvian Hockey League and Division B of the Eastern European Hockey League, a trans-national league made up of teams from Belarus, Latvia, Lithuania and Ukraine amongst others. Prizma achieved mid-table positions in both leagues, and the following season would return to the EEHL, however, the team struggled, winning only 3 of their 18 games. During this season, Prizma did not compete in the LHL, however, they did field a team in the Pirma Liga, the 2nd tier of the sport in the country, in which they finished 3rd.

Prizma returned solely to the LHL for the 2003-04 under the name of Prizma/Riga 86, and had a good season, finishing 3rd in Group B before losing in the play-off finals. During this season, future NHL and KHL player Kaspars Daugaviņš played for the team. After the culmination of the season, Prizma pulled out of organised hockey, save for a single season in the LHL as HS Riga/Prizma-Hanza in 2008, until returning to the LHL for the 2010–11 season. During this time, the team relocated to the Volvo Sports Centre which had been constructed by team owners SIA Prizma in 2005. HK Prizma's return to the LHL was a tepid affair, finishing 7th out of nine teams, before losing in the play-off quarter-finals. The following season, Prizma again fielded teams in two leagues; they remained in the LHL but also competed in the MHL B, a junior league based predominately in Russia. However, they continue to would struggle in both leagues, regularly finishing near the bottom of the table for the next two seasons. The 2013–14 season however was one of mixed success. Whilst the MHL squad finished dead last out of 32 teams, the LHL side would find success by finishing 3rd in the regular season, before going on to win their first Latvian Championship, beating HK Kurbads in the play-off finals. The season marked the last that Prizma would field teams a team in the MHL B; moving forward the team focused solely on the LHL.

The 2014–15 season saw Prizma defending their championship, however, they were unable to retain it having finished 4th in the regular season, before losing in the opening round of the play-offs to HK Zemgale/JLSS. They finished 5th the following season, and subsequently made it to the Bronze-medal game which they ultimately lost to HK Mogo. Prizma remained towards to the foot of the table during the 2016–17 season, winning 10 of their 30 games, finishing 6th out of 7 teams before ultimately losing in the opening round of the play-offs. The team would struggle during the following season in the newly renamed Optibet Hockey League too, finishing dead last having only won 4 games and failing to qualify for the play-offs. In the pursuing off-season, Prizma signed former Olympian and KHL player Armands Bērziņš, who had previously played for the team as a junior. With Bērziņš on board the teams fortunes improved, as they finished 4th out of 7 teams in the 2018-19 season however, they lost in the opening round of the play-offs. The team would regress during the 2019-20 season, finishing in 7th place besting only HS Rīga before the play-offs were cancelled due to COVID-19 pandemic.

In 2005 SIA Prizma founded the 'Pārdaugava' sports school, which focuses on ice hockey and figure skating. The year after its establishment, Pārdaugava was the first private sports education provider in Latvia to receive accreditation from the Latvian Ministry of Education and Science. During the 2019 off-season the team changed its name to HK Prizma/IHS in order to highlight its new partnership with the International Hockey School also based out of the Volvo Sports Centre. 

As a result of winning the Latvian Championship in 2014, Prizma qualified for the IIHF Continental Cup in 2015. They were drawn in Group C alongside KH Sanok of Poland, Romanian champions Corona Brașov and Hungarian side Dunaújvárosi Acélbikák. Prizma beat Sanok, but lost to both Corona Brașov and Dunaújvárosi; as a result they finished last in the group based on goal difference and did not progress to the next round.

Roster 
Updated February 22, 2021.

Season-by-season record
Note: GP = Games played, W = Wins, L = Losses, T = Ties, OTL = Overtime losses, Pts = Points, GF = Goals for, GA = Goals against, PIM = Penalties in minutes

Honours
Latvian Championships:
 2014

Team records

Career
These are the top five scorers in HK Prizma history.

''Note: Pos = Position; GP = Games played; G = Goals; A = Assists; Pts = Points

Penalty minutes: Daniels Riekstiņš, 325

Season

Regular season 
 Most goals in a season: Vitālijs Hvorostiņins, 22 (2015-16)
 Most assists in a season: Rihards Malinovskis, 31 (2008-09)
 Most points in a season: Rihards Malinovskis, 47 (2008-09)
 Most penalty minutes in a season: Pavel Vasilyev, 111 (2012–13)

Playoffs 
 Most goals in a playoff season: Ralfs Melders, 6 (2013–14)
 Most assists in a playoff season: Victor Lobachev, 12 (2013–14)
 Most points in a playoff season: Aleksandrs Baburins, 15 (2013–14)
 Most penalty minutes in a playoff season: Juris Bērziņš, 37 (2012–13)

Notable players
 Armands Bērziņš 
 Edijs Brahmanis
 Kaspars Daugaviņš
 Ralfs Freibergs
 Guntis Galviņš
 Mārtiņš Karsums
 Artūrs Kulda
 Miķelis Rēdlihs

References

External links
 

Ice hockey teams in Riga
Ice hockey teams in Latvia
Latvian Hockey League teams
Eastern European Hockey League teams
1997 establishments in Latvia
Ice hockey clubs established in 1997